Clathurella is a genus of sea snails, marine gastropod mollusks in the family Clathurellidae.

Description
The shell is fusiform or turriculated. The columella lip has no callosity, except a small posterior tooth. There is no operculum. The surface is cancellated and has a more ventricose form, and a more evident siphonal canal. This distinguishes it from Mangelia; the emargination of the outer lip from Clavatula; the texture and sculpture of the surface from Bela and Daphnella.

Species
Species within the genus Clathurella include:
 Clathurella aubryana (Hervier, 1896)
 Clathurella canfieldi Dall, 1871
 Clathurella capaniola (Dall, 1919)
 Clathurella clarocincta (Boettger, 1895) 
 Clathurella colombi Stahlschmidt, Poppe & Tagaro, 2018
 Clathurella crassilirata E. A. Smith, 1904
 Clathurella eversoni Tippett, 1995
 Clathurella extenuata (Dall, 1927)
 Clathurella fuscobasis Rehder, 1980
 Clathurella grayi (Reeve, 1845)
 Clathurella horneana (E. A. Smith, 1884)
 Clathurella leucostigmata (Hervier, 1896)
 Clathurella perdecorata (Dall, 1927)
 Clathurella peristernioides (Schepman, 1913)
 Clathurella pertabulata (Sturany, 1903)
 † Clathurella pierreaimei Ceulemans, Van Dingenen & Landau, 2018
 Clathurella polignaci Lamy, 1923 (taxon inquirendum)
 Clathurella ponsonbyi (G. B. Sowerby III, 1892) (taxon inquirendum)
 Clathurella rava (Hinds, 1843)
 Clathurella rogersi Melvill & Standen, 1896 (taxon inquirendum)
 Clathurella salarium P. Fischer in Locard, 1897 (taxon inquirendum)
 Clathurella squarrosa Hervier, 1897 (taxon inquirendum)
 Clathurella subquadrata (E. A. Smith, 1888)
 Clathurella verrucosa Stahlschmidt, Poppe & Tagaro, 2018
Species brought into synonymy
 † Clathurella abnormis W.F. Hutton, 1885: synonym of † Antiguraleus abnormis (Hutton, 1885)
 Clathurella albifuniculata (Reeve, 1846): synonym of Kermia albifuniculata (Reeve, 1846)
 Clathurella albovirgulata (Souverbie, 1860): synonym of Asperdaphne albovirgulata (Souverbie, 1860)
 Clathurella clathra Lesson, 1842: synonym of Muricodrupa fenestrata (Blainville, 1832)
 Clathurella conradiana Gabb, 1869: synonym of Crockerella conradiana (Gabb, 1869) (original combination)
 Clathurella crassilirata Hervier, 1897: synonym of Pseudodaphnella crasselirata (Hervier, 1897) (original combination)
 Clathurella enginaeformis G. & H. Nevill, 1875: synonym of Rahitoma enginaeformis (G. & H. Nevill, 1875)
 Clathurella epidelia Duclos in Chenu, 1848: synonym of Maculotriton serriale (Deshayes, 1834)
 Clathurella irretita Hedley, 1899: synonym of Kermia irretita (Hedley, 1899)
 Clathurella maryae McLean & Poorman, 1971: synonym of Etrema maryae (McLean & Poorman, 1971)
 Clathurella pulicaris Lesson, 1842: synonym of Maculotriton serriale (Deshayes, 1834)
 Clathurella rigida (Hinds, 1843): synonym of Lienardia rigida (Hinds, 1843)
 Clathurella tessellata: synonym of Kermia tessellata (Hinds, 1843)

References

External links
 Carpenter P.P. (1857). Catalogue of the collection of Mazatlan Mollusca in the British Museum collected by Frederick Reigen. London, xvi + 552 pp
 Smith, E.A. (1888) Diagnoses of new species of Pleurotomidae in the British Museum. Annals and Magazine of Natural History, series 6, 2, 300–317
 P Bartsch. "The Nomenclatorial Status of Certain Northern Turritid Mollusks"; Proceedings of the biological Society of Washington 54, 1-14, 1941
 G. & H. Nevill, Descriptions of New Marine Mollusca from the Indian Ocean; The journal of the Asiatic Society of Bengal. vol. 44 p. 2, 1875

 
Gastropod genera